Hemant Joshi is a Professor of Mass Communication and Journalism. He has taught Communication, Radio, TV along with Hindi journalism for three decades at Indian Institute of Mass Communication, New Delhi (1989-2019) and Jamia Millia Islamia, New Delhi (2006–2008).

He is also a poet and a writer who has been contributing columns and articles on various issues in leading Hindi Newspapers.

He knows Hindi, English, French, Italian, and Russian in order of competence. He has worked as an interpreter in various international conferences and translated from French and Hindi and English and vice versa.

Joshi is a member of various national and International bodies i.e. International Association of Mass Communication Research (IAMCR), International Communication Association (ICA), International Pragmatics Association (IPrA), Brussels, Global Initiative for Local Computing (GILC), Ireland, World Association of Community Radio Broadcasters (AMARC).

He was elected a member of the International Council of IAMCR for four years in its annual general body meeting held in Stockholm, Sweden in 2008. His wife is a TV newsreader Manjari Joshi and he is the son-in-law of the Hindi poet, writer, and journalist Raghuvir Sahay.

Bibliography
 Mahayuddhon ke Aaspaas (महायुद्धों के आसपास) (Translated Anthology of 8 French Poets), Gaurav Prakashan, New Delhi.
 Arthat (अर्थात्) (Ed.) (Journalistic writings of Raghuvir Sahay), Rajkamal Prakashan, New Delhi.
 Asserting Voices (Edited with Sanjay Kumar), Deshkaal Prakashan, New Delhi.
 Writing for Media (2011), (co author Mrs. Manjari Joshi), Vikas Publishing House, New Delhi. 
 Fundamentals of Journalism and Mass Communication (2011), (co author Mrs. Manjari Joshi), Vikas Publishing House, New Delhi. 
 Communication for Development (2011), (co author Mrs. Manjari Joshi), Vikas Publishing House, New Delhi.

References

External links
 Hemant Joshi at Kavita Kosh 
 Hemant Joshi at Blogspot
 Hemant Joshi at IIMC, New Delhi
 Works by Hemant Joshi

Journalists from Uttarakhand
20th-century Indian linguists
20th-century Indian translators
Indian male journalists
Jawaharlal Nehru University alumni
Academic staff of Jamia Millia Islamia
Hindi-language poets
Hindi-language writers
1954 births
Living people
People from Nainital
Poets from Uttarakhand
20th-century Indian poets
20th-century Indian male writers